Lita zu Putlitz (real name Elisabeth Karoline Josephine Gans zu Putlitz), (27 October 1862 at  – 1935) was a German woman writer.

Life 
Putlitz was the only daughter of the married couple Gustav and Elisabeth Gans zu Putlitz, née Countess Königsmarck. A younger brother named Victor died as an infant. After the death of her father, Lita zu Putlitz lived with her mother and a brother at Schloss Retzin.

She wrote an autobiographical essay entitled Aus dem Bildersaal meines Lebens and 1813, a festival play in two acts, as well as literary occasional works. She also published her mother's memoirs.

References

External links 
 

German women writers
1862 births
1935 deaths
People from Prignitz